Sarıqamış may refer to:
Sarıqamış, Neftchala, Azerbaijan
Sarıqamış, Samukh, Azerbaijan
Sarıkamış, Turkey